The Marriage of Ramuntcho (French: Le mariage de Ramuntcho) is a 1947 French comedy film directed by Max de Vaucorbeil and starring Gaby Sylvia, André Dassary and Frank Villard. It was shot using the Agfacolor process. It was made at the Victorine Studios in Nice.

Cast

References

Bibliography 
 Crisp, C.G. The Classic French Cinema, 1930-1960. Indiana University Press, 1993.

External links 
 

1947 films
1947 comedy films
French comedy films
1940s French-language films
Films directed by Max de Vaucorbeil
Films based on French novels
1940s French films
Films shot at Victorine Studios